Lovy L. Elias (born 25 November 1985), aka Prophet Lovy Elias also known by his stage name Lovy Longomba, is a Kenyan pastor, producer, songwriter, musician and life coach.

Early life 
Lovy Longomba Elias was born on November 25, 1985, in Nairobi, Kenya. He is of East African and Congolese ancestry. His father Lovy Longomba Sr. was a member of Orchestra Super Mazembe, a Congolese band, and his grandfather Vicky Longomba was a member of TPOK Jazz.

Elias started his own musical career after high school, and co-founded a hip hop/soukous musical group called Longombas, with his brother, Christian and cousin Masengo. The group has won several awards in Kenya.

In 2007, Elias and his brother relocated to Los Angeles, CA, where the group was disbanded. He then became a pastor and focused only on writing and producing for established artists. In 2014, Elias was recognized as one of the producers and songwriters for Change Your Life (Iggy Azalea song) which was nominated for a Grammy Award.

Revelation Church of Jesus Christ 
In 2013, Elias started a prayer group in Woodland Hills, CA. He held weekly teachings, bible studies, and fellowship out of his living room. Later Elias established the Revelation Church of Jesus Christ.

By 2016, Elias began renting out space in Van Nuys, CA, to accommodated their needs. On July 14, 2016, Elias started holding fellowships in Van Nuys, CA. In 2017, he founded Revelation Church of Jesus Christ and led sermons as head pastor. The congregation has since grown to more than a thousand members with more online. Elias is also a life coach to celebrities and athletes. On April 3, 2019, Elias started livestreaming his teachings on platforms such as YouTube and Facebook. Elias regularly livestreams his teachings, with past teachings archived on YouTube. On Feb 7, 2021, Elias relocated Revelation Church of Jesus Christ's headquarter and worship center to Simi Valley, CA.

Personal life 

Elias was married to the former Idah, nee Onyango, Longomba. They have a son, Andrew. On June 16, 2017, he filed for a dissolution of marriage with a minor child in Los Angeles Superior Court. In 2020, Elias changed his name to Lovy Elias. His brother, Christian Hulu Longomba, born on June 30, 1984, died March 12, 2021, in Los Angeles, after a long illness.

He is married to Maggie Elias.

On April 3, 2021, Elias received an honorary doctoral degree from Next Dimension University, an unaccredited religious school and church in Los Angeles, CA.

Songwriting and producing

References

External links

1985 births
Living people